Horseshoe Gaming Holding Corporation was established in 1993 with its only asset being the rights to use the Horseshoe name on casinos.  The corporation was a private holding company mostly owned by Jack Binion.

History

In 1994, the company acquired the Horseshoe Bossier City.  The following year it opened a second casino Horseshoe Casino Tunica.

In 1999 the company grew more by acquiring Empress Casinos and its two casinos.  

In 2001, the Empress Casino in Joliet was sold to Argosy Gaming Company and the Empress Casino in Hammond was rebranded to the Horseshoe Casino Hammond which opened under the new name on May 4, 2001.

In 2004 the corporation was sold to Harrah's Entertainment which retained the corporation as the operating company for its Horseshoe branded casinos.

Casinos
Horseshoe Bossier City
Horseshoe Casino Tunica
Horseshoe Hammond
Empress Casino

References
Las Vegas Review-Journal

External links 
Horseshoe Casino Resorts on Harrahs.com

Gambling companies of the United States
Gambling companies established in 1993
Companies based in Nevada
Harrah's Entertainment